For Sale is a 1924 American drama film directed by George Archainbaud and written by Fred Stanley. The film stars Claire Windsor, Adolphe Menjou, Robert Ellis, Mary Carr, Tully Marshall, and John Patrick. The film was released on June 15, 1924, by Associated First National Pictures.

Cast

Preservation
With no copies of For Sale located in any film archives, it is a lost film.

References

External links

Stills and lobby cards at Claire Windsor website

1924 films
1920s English-language films
Silent American drama films
1924 drama films
First National Pictures films
Films directed by George Archainbaud
American silent feature films
American black-and-white films
1920s American films